Waldemar Fritsch (23 March 1909 – 13 July 1978) was a Sudeten-German porcelain sculptor and ceramist, who lived and worked in Ansbach, Germany after his expulsion from West Bohemia in 1946.

Biography 

Waldemar Fritsch was born in 1909 as a tenth and last child in Altrohlau (today Stará Role, part of Karlovy Vary), part of the double monarchy of Austria-Hungary. His father worked as a fiacre in Karlovy Vary until the age of 75.  After graduating from the Volks und Bürgerschule, Fritsch trained as a porcelain tool and mold founder in the "Viktoria" porcelain factory in Altrohlau. The area around Egerland, Karlovy Vary and Teplitz-Schönau were regarded as important sites of the porcelain and ceramics industry. Technical schools for the technical and artistic training of ceramists existed in Karlovy Vary (since 1925) and Teplitz-Schönau (1875), and in 1811 porcelain was produced in Altrohlau.

Fritsch went to the Prague School of Fine Art from 1929 and the Porzellanfachschule Karlsbad-Fischern from 1926.  In his creations, he drew attention by the artistic quality of small sculptures such as the terracotta-relief "Jugend," a kitten and chicken group as well as a lying wolfshund.  In Prague, he created porcelain sculptures of Saint Sebastian, a loreley, a cockatoos, and a woman with a child and a baby.

In 1934, Fritsch received an assistant position at the state school for ceramics in Teplitz-Schönau, which he took over in the autumn of 1938.  In 1939, he was awarded a professorship for applied sculpture to the State College of the Porcelain Industry in Karlovy Vary.  After denouncing the Nazis, Fritsch was imprisoned in Dresden and Berlin by the Gestapo in 1939.  When freed in 1940, he was forbidden to work.  From 1943 and until the war ended, he served in the Wehrmacht.

In 1946, he moved to southwest Germany with his 80-year-old parents, where he found a new home in Ansbach in 1947 after temporary stays in Stuttgart-Wendlingen and Ellingen. A period of great creativity followed after moving to Ansbach.  His porcelain sculptures were in the Ansbach museum, which dedicated a special exhibition to Fritsch in 1963. He died 13 July 1978 in Ansbach and is buried in the cemetery of the church of St. Lambertus in Ansbach-Eyb.

Works 
His works, in approximate chronological order are:

Scalare 
Egerländer farmers couple
Girl with the carnation 
Holy family on the run 
Floating 
Blessing Christ 
Sinning youth 
Venus in the arbor 
Lying youth 
Lying girls 
Dreikönig's group 
Listening 
Christ's head 
Young man's head 
Allegory on Carlsbad 
Day, night and morning 
Night Song 
Ecce homo 
Xuchitl 
Ixcauatzine

References

Further reading 
By Fritsch
 Waldemar Fritsch: Porzellan, Keramik, Plastik. Delpsche Verlagsbuchhandlung, 1961. (16 Seiten)
 Waldemar Fritsch, Georg Lengl: Das Gesicht: Porträts und kompositorische Bildnisse. H. Carl, 1969. (15 Seiten)
 Waldemar Fritsch, Lothar Henning: Natur und Phantastik: Plastik, Porträt, Porzellan. Ansbacher Museumsverlag, 1983. (100 Seiten)

By others
 Adolf Lang: Waldemar Fritsch: Natur und Phantastik; Plastik, Porträt, Porzellan. Ansbacher Museumsverlag, 1977. (84 Seiten)
 Xaver Schaffer: Waldemar Fritsch: Porzellan, Keramik, Plastik. Delp, 1961. (16 Seiten)
 Justin Siegert: Waldemar Fritsch: dem Egerländer Porzellanbildner zum Gedächtnis. Duppel, 1980. (11 Seiten)

External links 
  in the catalog of the German National Library

German sculptors
1909 births
1978 deaths
People from Ansbach
People from Karlovy Vary
German ceramists
German male sculptors
20th-century sculptors
20th-century ceramists
Czechoslovak emigrants to Germany